Grayven is a supervillain published by DC Comics. He first appeared in Green Lantern (vol. 3) #74 (June 1996), and was created by Ron Marz and Darryl Banks making him one of the few characters related to Darkseid not to have been created by Jack Kirby.

Fictional character biography
Grayven is the third son of Darkseid, born of an unknown mother and apparently without his father's knowledge, younger brother to Kalibak and Orion. Grayven leads a campaign of destruction against the cosmos, destroying planets. He leads a campaign against the Darkstars, a galactic police force, killing many of their number. His campaign comes to an end on the planet Rann. He desires a zeta beam device, a product of Rannian science that provides instantaneous transportation on a grand scale. He intends to zeta beam his forces onto Apokolips, announce his presence to his father, and conquer the planet.

While the remaining Darkstars engaged Grayven's army, Green Lantern Kyle Rayner faces off against the man himself. Assisted by former Green Lantern and current Darkstar John Stewart, who suffers serious injuries in the fight, Kyle tricks Grayven into a Zeta Beam device, where he is teleported off Rann. Lacking their leader, Grayven's forces retreated.

Unknown to Stewart, Rayner had inadvertently teleported Grayven deep within Earth's core. He eventually digs himself out, and seeks Rayner in New York City, who is seemingly able to overpower Grayven. Fearing defeat at the Green Lantern's hands, Grayven used an experimental teleporter, freeing himself, and in the process, sending Rayner into the 30th century.

Imperiex
Grayven next appeared during the Imperiex crisis, as part of an alien alliance that also included Maxima, Starfire, Adam Strange, and Darkseid. They sought to eliminate Imperiex, a cosmic giant who destroys whole solar systems. In The Adventures of Superman #595 (October 2001), Grayven is under the influence of Brainiac-13, a major force in the Imperiex War. He confronts Superman and Darkseid on the surface of Apokolips. He is defeated by Superman, then punished by Darkseid, who feels it is his duty to do so because Grayven has 'shamed himself'. Soon, Grayven is banished to Earth.

Last Laugh and Ion
During his banishment to Earth, Grayven is infected with a variant of Joker toxin that causes insanity. He attempts to perform at, and then destroy, a comedy club. Kyle Rayner again stops him. Grayven later reappeared in Ion: Guardian of the Universe. There he is revealed to have sent Nero and Effigy after Kyle Rayner. Grayven also is implied to be part of some larger conspiracy, most likely that of the Sinestro Corps due to his hunting of escaped Qwardians and knowledge of Kyle's sick mother. Rayner blasts Grayven into unconsciousness.

Death of the New Gods
Grayven has since appeared in Five of a Kind: Thunder/Martian Manhunter, lobotomized and nearly catatonic. Thunder and Martian Manhunter restore his mind and assist him in building a zeta beam generator meant to send the unknown scourge of the New Gods (as seen in Countdown) to Darkseid's throne room. This would force Darkseid and the killer to fight, with the result benefitting Grayven either way. Thunder and J'onn trick Grayven, however; J'onn shapeshifts into the Black Racer, the New Gods' incarnation of Death, which prompts Grayven to use the zeta beam on himself to escape. Moments later at his destination, he is found and murdered by the real killer (later revealed to be Infinity-Man).

Powers and abilities
Grayven possesses formidable super-strength and endurance. Additionally, as a New God, he cannot die from natural causes. His greatest power is a limited form of the Omega Effect used by his father Darkseid. His power levels are high enough to easily fight the Green Lantern Kyle Rayner and the Darkstars, yet not enough to take on Superman, who easily defeated him with a single blow.

In other media

Animation
 Grayven makes his animated debut in Young Justice: Outsiders, appearing in a flashback. In season 4, he appears as Darkseid's envoy and Ma'alefa'ak's superior, voiced by Dee Bradley Baker. He returns in Young Justice: Phantoms.

References

External links
GLCorps.org: Grayven
Superman Site: Grayven
DCU Guide: Grayven Chronology

Fictional characters with superhuman durability or invulnerability
Fictional princes
New Gods of Apokolips
Comics characters introduced in 1996
Characters created by Ron Marz
DC Comics characters who can move at superhuman speeds
DC Comics characters with superhuman strength
DC Comics deities
DC Comics supervillains